Seth Lazar (born 1979) is an Australian philosopher and Professor of Philosophy at the Australian National University. He is also Head of the School of Philosophy. 

Lazar won the Frank Chapman Sharp Prize in 2011 "for the best unpublished monograph on the philosophy of war and peace".
He is known for his research on defensive war.

Lazar's recent work has focused on "the morality, law, and politics of AI", with a particular focus on "the political philosophy of data and AI." In 2021, Lazar was awarded an Australian Research Council Future Fellowship for the proposal "Automatic Authorities: Charting a Course for Legitimate AI.".

Books
 Sparing Civilians, Oxford University Press, 2015
 The Morality of Defensive War, (Co-Editor, with Fabre, C), Oxford University Press, 2014
 Oxford Handbook of Ethics of War, (Co-Editor, with Helen Frowe), Oxford University Press, 2018

References

External links
Seth Lazar at the ANU
Seth Lazar's Personal Website

Australian philosophers
Analytic philosophers
Political philosophers
Philosophy academics
Living people
Academic staff of the Australian National University
1979 births
Alumni of the University of Oxford